The Wellington and Manawatu Line is an unofficial name for the section of New Zealand's North Island Main Trunk Railway between Wellington and Palmerston North. Originally a government project, the line (initially known as the West Coast Railway) was constructed by the private Wellington and Manawatu Railway Company and bought by the government in December 1908.

Proposals
Proposals for a railway line on the west coast of the North Island predated proposals for a railway line from Wellington to the Wairarapa, but land-owning interests in the Wairarapa saw that the latter line was given higher priority. Proposals for a line along the west coast did not resurface until 1878, following the completion of the Palmerston North - Foxton Line in 1876. Proposals were based on the line from the Hutt Valley. The Public Works Department conducted a number of surveys a concluded there were three possible routes: from Upper Hutt via the Akatarawa Valley to Waikanae; from Taitā in the Hutt Valley to Paekākāriki via Haywards; and via Johnsonville and Porirua. The final option was settled on, as the first two required significant tunnelling, then not feasible (Wellington had a population of just 22,000 in 1878).

Construction
The government of Sir George Grey approved the construction of the line, which was included in the Public Works Estimates, reported to the House of Representatives on 27 August 1878. The final details of the survey were completed, and the first construction workers were hired on 21 August 1879. However, Grey's government was defeated in October 1879, and the government of Sir John Hall elected in its place. Hall had the line removed from the Public Works Estimates and then created a Royal Commission to review the government's public works programme, with a view to reducing government expenditure. The Commission reviewed the Wellington - Manawatu line in March 1880, and concluded that work should be abandoned.

In response, John Plimmer, considered the "father of Wellington", proposed the formation of a private company to build and operate the line. The Wellington Chamber of Commerce supported the move, and the Wellington and Manawatu Railway Company was formed in May 1881. That year the government passed the Railway Construction and Land Act, which allowed joint stock companies to build and run private railways, so long as they were built to the government's specified gauge and connected with a government line. The company signed a contract to construct the line in 1882, acquiring the land on which the line was to be built and materials used in the abandoned section of the line. Only one change was made to the Public Works surveys - the line was to connect with the government's line at Longburn, instead of Foxton, leaving the Palmerston North - Foxton Line a branch line.

The company immediately let contracts for construction from Wellington to Wadestown, now part of the Johnsonville Line. They hired Harry Higginson, a distinguished engineer from Dunedin, to oversee construction. Higginson brought with him brothers Arthur and James Fulton. Arthur Fulton was given responsibility for the Longburn to Waikanae section, and James the Waikanae to Wellington section. A contract was let in April 1882 for the construction of the Longburn - Manawatu River section, which included the Manawatu River bridge, the longest on the line. Higginson had a special wharf built on the Manawatu River near the bridge site, to allow steamers to offload construction materials for the bridge. In August the Wadestown - Crofton section contract was let, with the construction of two tunnels. The next contract let was for Johnsonville to Porirua, including the Belmont Viaduct, the highest on the line. The formation reached Paremata by mid-January 1885, with rails being laid over this section six months later.

The rails from Paremata reached Pukerua Bay in 1885; the No 12 or Pukerua contract.   

The next section, the No 13 Contract from  Pukerua Bay to Paekākāriki, was the most difficult; see North–South Junction. It included six tunnels built against a steep cliff face. A temporary tramway was constructed from below No. 13 tunnel to allow goods and passengers to be transhipped to a stagecoach to Foxton. Material for the construction of the tunnels between Paekākāriki and Pukerua Bay were unloaded at a makeshift wharf constructed in Brendan's Bay. Meanwhile, rails were within two miles of Waikanae in the north by 25 September, with a service from Otaki connecting the two railheads. The laying of the line from Pukerua Bay to Paekākāriki was completed on 4 October 1886, and on 27 October the lines from Waikanae and Paekākāriki met at Otaihanga. The first revenue-earning train, a stock train from Longburn to Johnsonville with 355 sheep and 60 head of cattle, was on 30 October.  

The section was officially opened on 3 November 1886, when the last spike was driven at a public ceremony by the Governor of New Zealand, Sir William Jervois. A public timetable was introduced on 1 December 1886.

List of Railway Contracts 
The following contracts were let by the WMR for construction of the line in 1882-85; 
The northern section supervised by James Fulton comprised (from North to South):
No 7 Contract Palmerston (actually to Longburn, and including the Manawatu River Bridge) let to the Wilkie Brothers
No 11 Contract Palmerston let to the Wilkie Brothers
No 13 Contract Manawatu let to the Wilkie Brothers
No 14 Contract Manawatu let to Seymour of Auckland (on 25 March 1884) 
No 16 Contract Otaki let to P Campbell & Co of Dunedin
No 17 Contract Waikanae  (Nos 17, 18 were not called until 14 July 1885) 
No 18 Contract Waikanae
 
The southern section supervised by Arthur Fulton comprised (from North to South): 
No 13 Contract Paekakariki let to Samuel Brown; The most difficult contract; see North–South Junction 
No 12 Pukerua Contract from Paremata Bridge with a four-mile climb to the Pukerua Saddle (above the Plimmerton - now Taupo swamp) 
No 10 Contract from Porirua to (and including) the Paremata (estuary) Bridge let to Henderson and Co of Dunedin
No 8 Contract beyond Johnsonville to Porirua including the Belmont Viaduct let to Danaker.  
No 9 Contract from Crofton (Ngaio) to Johnsonville with two tunnels (No 6,7)  between Khandallah and Johnsonvillle let to Anderson & Co. 
No 6 (Crofton section) Contract with two tunnels before Crofton  (No 4,5) and an embankment between them  let to P McGrath (who failed) then Trevor and Shields.
No 7 Contract (Wadestown section); the first section from Wellington with three tunnels (No 1,2,3) plus the bridge over the Hutt Road and harbour reclamation for the terminus (22 then 29 acres) for the expanded terminus let to J Sanders (who failed)  then Trevor and Shields

See also
 Wellington and Manawatu Railway Company
 Johnsonville Line 
 Kapiti Line
 North–South Junction (from Pukerua Bay to Paekakariki)

References

Citations

Bibliography

 
 
  

Railway lines in New Zealand
Rail transport in the Wellington Region
Rail transport in Manawatū-Whanganui
Railway lines opened in 1886